Survivor: David vs. Goliath is the 37th season of the American CBS competitive reality television series Survivor. The season features 20 new contestants divided into two tribes embodied by two biblical figures: "David", composed of ten underdogs who constantly have to overcome obstacles, and "Goliath", composed of ten overachievers who have used their advantages in life to excel in their fields. The season premiered on September 26, 2018, with an extended 90-minute episode, and concluded with a live season finale on December 19, 2018, where Nick Wilson was named the winner over Mike White and Angelina Keeley in a 7–3–0 vote.

This season was the sixth to be filmed in Fiji. Due to Severe Tropical Cyclone Keni striking during the season's filming, the castaways and crew were evacuated for two days, the second such occurrence on Survivor following Survivor: Millennials vs. Gen X, which had also been filmed in Fiji two years earlier.

Contestants

The cast is composed of 20 players splitting into two tribes. On day 10 during the tribe switch, David and Goliath were renamed Vuku and Jabeni, meaning "ability" and "champion" in Fijian, respectively. The third tribe, Tiva, was named after the Fijian word for "divert" or "stray". Notable contestants from this season include filmmaker and two-time The Amazing Race contestant Mike White, and professional wrestler and Tough Enough III co-winner John Hennigan. The merged tribe Kalokalo was named after the Fijian word for "star", which was suggested by contestant Elizabeth Olson.

Future appearances
Nick Wilson returned to compete on Survivor: Winners at War.

Outside of Survivor, Kara Kay and Angelina Keeley made cameo appearances in the Season 2 premiere of The White Lotus, which was written and directed by Mike White.  Alec Merlino also played a recurring role as a waiter in Season 1.

Season summary
The 20 new castaways were divided into two tribes based on adversity: David (underdogs) and Goliath (overachievers). Due to a series of injuries, the David tribe were down in numbers when the tribes were shuffled; on all three new tribes, the Goliaths held the majority. However, the Davids were able to take advantage of the dissension among the Goliaths, working with them to eliminate several Goliaths.

The Goliaths entered the merge in the majority. While the Goliaths tried to decimate the David alliance, the Davids’ sharp strategizing and well-timed playing of advantages put them in the majority after blindsiding the Goliath alliance’s leaders, John and Dan. Christian and Gabby then betrayed their David alliance to eliminate Carl, which ultimately turned the other Davids against them; Mike from the Goliath alliance used the opportunity to lead the charge to eliminate the rest of the Davids, while Kara played both sides from the middle. However, Nick from the David tribe won the last three immunity challenges, making his way to the end of the game with Goliaths (and Jabeni tribemates) Mike and Angelina. The jury respected Nick's social game and ability to fight his way out of being an underdog over Mike's late-game strategic emergence and Angelina's selfish, manipulative personality, voting Nick the Sole Survivor in a 7-3-0 vote over Mike and Angelina respectively.

Episodes

Voting history

Notes

Reception 
Survivor: David vs. Goliath received universal acclaim from both critics and fans, with many considering it one of the best seasons in the show's history due to its strategic play, unpredictability, and memorable contestants. The Tribal Councils also received praise for being entertaining and unpredictable, with the councils in the eighth and ninth episodes, during which the former Davids used game advantages to vote out former Goliaths John and Dan despite not having the numbers on their side, earning particular attention as impressive and smartly executed blindsides, and have been hailed by several media outlets as two of the best Tribal Councils in Survivor history. Angelina Keeley's performance was also well received, with her quickly becoming one of the most notable and entertaining characters in the history of the show due to her tendency to constantly overplay in an unknowingly transparent way, making all her attempted strategic moves obvious to the other players.

Nicole Clark of Vice called the season "the best thing on TV this year", and "one of the best [seasons] in recent history", praising the cast and memorable Tribal Councils. She concluded: "It’s a rollicking clusterfuck to watch, one that only gets more and more convoluted as the season develops. If you’re a potential Survivor fan looking for a season to start with, this is the one to pick." Joe Reid of Decider argued that David vs. Goliath was potentially the best season of the show, stating "Up until now, the closest thing to a consensus choice for Best Survivor Season Ever has been season 20: Heroes vs. Villains. That was an all-star season full of returning players, which meant it had the advantage of characters we loved and had long histories with, playing with and against their own reputations. Consider that David vs. Goliath was starting from scratch and you’ll see why this season has been getting such respect." He felt that "the ready-made underdog storyline worked wonders", that the season had "more memorable, sharable (sic) moments than any season in recent memory", and that it "has been hugely satisfying to both halves of the Survivor fan brain: the half that craves clever, savvy game play and the half that craves big, memorable characters. It’s harder than you think to marry the two."

Josh Wigler of The Hollywood Reporter called it "one of the most consistently exhilarating seasons in recent memory" and "one of the most exciting iterations of the CBS reality franchise", adding,"Years from now, when Survivor fans look back on the events of David vs. Goliath, a slew of memories are likely to come to mind: the season-opening medical evacuation, Natalie Napalm and 'Jacketgate,' just to name a few." In an article published two thirds into the season, Dalton Ross of Entertainment Weekly claimed that while "[not] every episode this season has been A+++", "every episode has had something. Every episode has earned its keep. Every episode has felt like it is moving the story forward. Yes, the cast is better, but the editing and the storytelling have been better as well." Ross ranked David vs. Goliath as the fifth-best season of the series, only behind Borneo and Micronesia (tied for first), Heroes vs. Villains, and Cagayan. After the ninth episode, FanSided stated, "Let's be thankful for just how great the season has gone." Lauren Piester of E! called David vs. Goliath "One of the best seasons of Survivor ever". In 2020, "Purple Rock Podcast" ranked this season 12th out of 40 due to the casting and great gameplay. Later in the year, Inside Survivor ranked this season 5th out of 40 saying "It's not just one of the best seasons of recent memory; it's also rightfully placed as one of the greatest of all time." In 2021, Rob Has a Podcast ranked David vs. Goliath 6th during the Survivor All-Time Top 40 Rankings podcast.

In an interview in November 2018, Jeff Probst acknowledged the cast of David vs. Goliath as "one of the best groups we’ve ever had." He also highly praised the Tribal Councils in episodes eight and nine, calling the first "a total shocker and a brilliant move" and the second "a historic Survivor moment" and "all we could have ever dared dream when we put the Nullifier into this season."

References

External links
 Official CBS Survivor Website

37
2018 in Fiji
2018 American television seasons
Television shows filmed in Fiji
Television shows set in Fiji